In My Father's Den is a 1972 novel by New Zealand author Maurice Gee.

The novel was adapted to film in 2004, written and directed by Brad McGann.

First edition
In My Father's Den. London: Faber, 1972. Auckland: Oxford UP, 1978.
The novel follows Paul Prior, an English Teacher in Henderson (called Wadesville in the novel), a suburb of Auckland, after the brutal murder of his student and protégé, Celia Inverarity. In coming to terms with Celia's death Paul must first address his past and the demons that lie within it.

The film adaptation follows a very similar storyline. It follows Paul Prior, a world-weary photographer who returns to central Otago for his father's funeral. The appearance of Celia, who has connections with his past, prompts him to stay and he battles his past while discovering the truth about his childhood and the demons that lie within it.

References

1972 novels
Books by Maurice Gee
20th-century New Zealand novels
New Zealand novels adapted into films
Novels set in New Zealand
Auckland in fiction

id:In My Father's Den